The BPSA in Canada was established in Victoria, British Columbia in 1996 as The Baden-Powell Scouts' Association of Canada (B-PSAC), rejecting the perceived modernization of the Scout method by Scouts Canada and sharing its aims with the other branches of the B-PSA. It is affiliated with the World Federation of Independent Scouts. The association was incorporated in British Columbia in 2000.

Organization
The BPSA in Canada is a federation of independent provincial Traditional Scouting associations, comprising
 BPSA Alberta - www.bpsa-ab.ca
 BPSA British Columbia - www.bpsa-bc.ca
 BPSA Ontario - www.bpsa.on.ca
 BPSA New Brunswick - www.bpsa-nb.ca

Membership is restricted to independent Canadian Scouting councils who follow the training programmes, ethics and morals of Robert Baden-Powell, and who accept the association's by-laws and child protection policy.

Training programme
The training programme of the BPSA in Canada follows the model developed by Baden-Powell in Scouting For Boys (1908), The Wolf Cub's Handbook (1916) and Rovering to Success (1922). The associations claim to use the same badge system, ranks and uniform that were worn by Scouts nearly 100 years ago, following a charter set down in their Policy Organization and Rules.

The main policy is Traditional Scouting – which is taking Baden-Powell's 10 Scout Laws and using them, the same rank system Baden-Powell used of Tenderpad, First Star and Second Star in Timber Wolves. They use the Grand Howl at the beginning of Timber Wolf meetings and for Explorers and Senior Explorers they use the same ranks as in Scouting for Boys with Tenderfoot, 2nd Class, First Class, Scout Cord etc.

The programme is intended to develop a sense of duty, personal discipline and honour. Explorers in the BPSA in Canada practice traditional Scouting skills such as:
 Outdoor scoutcraft including things like lighting fire by friction
 Orienteering including navigating by means other than a compass
 Youth leadership - Troops are led by a youth Troop Leader and Patrols by youth Patrol Leaders

Scout Law
This Law is kept by Explorers from the age of eleven and up. Adult leaders must renew their promise on regular occasions and are expected to continue to live according to the Scout Law:

 A Scout's honour is to be trusted
 A Scout is Loyal.
 A Scout's duty is to be useful and to help others.
 A Scout is a friend to all and a brother to every other Scout.
 A Scout is Courteous.
 A Scout is a friend to animals.
 A Scout obeys orders of his parents, patrol leader or Scoutmaster without question.
 A Scout smiles and whistles under all difficulties.
 A Scout is thrifty.
 A Scout is clean in thought, word and deed.

Sections
The Baden-Powell Service Association in Canada has sections for each age range.

There are Seafarers (Sea Scouts), and a Lone Scouting plan for children living in remote locations who would otherwise be unable to take part in Scouting.

Child protection
The BPSA in Canada requires all adult volunteers to complete a vulnerable sector criminal record check, provide four personal references and complete a personal interview before appointment. Once appointed, volunteers must complete a four-month probationary period where they may only work with young people under supervision of a warranted leader. Adults are also required to complete training appropriate to their role in the group and report anyone who they consider may pose a danger to young people to the governing BPSA council.

Controversies 

The Baden-Powell Scouts' Association of Canada was incorporated on June 19, 1998 (Canada corporation number 350552-9). It started in Alberta under Kerry John Patrick Conlin, who was warranted as the Provincial Commissioner on December 28, 1998. From Alberta, Branches sprung up in Ontario, and BC, which had already started a traditional Scout movement, joined the fledgling Association. During that initial year, Mr. Mitch Rasmussen was made the Provincial Commissioner for Alberta and Kerry John Patrick Conlin was made the Branch Commissioner. Shortly thereafter, Scouts Canada initiated an "Allegation of Confusion" regarding the use of the word "Scout" in its title. On February 16, 2000, the corporation was renamed to "BPSA Canada". This corporation was dissolved on May 11, 2015. The BPSA-BC was incorporated in 2000.

Because BC and Ontario Provincial Commissioners were not willing to compromise to the degree Alberta was, there was a fracturing of the National Association. Provincial Branches broke away from Alberta, and BC and Ontario linked up to reform a "traditional style" Scouting program without the use of the word "Scout".

In 1999, the reformed Baden-Powell Service Association Federation of Canada (B-PSAFC) was ordered by Industry Canada "to take the word 'scout' out of its title." Scouts Canada also sought for the removal of the name Baden Powell, going on to say "...there's one scouting association in Canada, one in the world, every country has only one that's how Baden Powell set up scouting..." because "[Baden Powell] felt anything else would dilute the program, cause confusion and hurt the programs for young people." The World Organization of the Scouting Movement (WOSM) website reinforces this policy which states, "There can only be one [National Scout Organizations] per country."

According to B-PSAFC, Baden-Powell's original intention for Scouts Patrols to operate in a range of organizations and that there are two WOSM Scout associations in Canada. Scouts Canada contests the existence of two WOSM associations in Canada, clarifying their relationship with Association des Scouts du Canada to be one of an affiliation. Scouts Canada is the official WOSM organization which affiliates with the francophone organization.

Although the BPSA in Canada, in accord with Baden-Powell's 4th Scout Law, aim to recognize and work with all like-minded Scouting associations, Scouts Canada forbade their members to join activities with members or groups of the BPSA, citing missing insurance coverage, or permit them to use Scouts Canada properties.

References

External links
 BPSA in Canada

Canada
Scouting and Guiding in Canada